Before & After is an album by Swedish band The Wannadies. Originally released in Scandinavia in 2002 on two compact discs comprising the 'before' and 'after' parts, the album was released on 8 September 2003 in the UK on a single disc with an enhanced multimedia section featuring videos for the singles "Skin", "Disko" and "Little By Little".

Track listing

References

External links
Official Wannadies website

The Wannadies albums
2002 albums